Salma Saleh (born 19 December 2003) is an Egyptian rhythmic gymnast. She was a member of the team that represented Egypt in the 2016 and 2020 African Championships. She represented Egypt at the 2020 Summer Olympics.

Career 
Saleh is a member of the Egyptian Gymnastics Federation. On 28 August – 03 September 2016, Saleh competed for Egypt in the junior group events at the 13th African Rhythmic Gymnastics Championships which were held in Walvis Bay, winning three gold medals in the 5-hoop events, in the 5-ball events and in the 5-hoop + 5-ball event.

On 10 to 15 March 2020, she competed in the group events at the 15th African Rhythmic Gymnastics Championships which were held in Sharm El Sheikh, winning three gold medals in the All-Around events, 5-balls events and in 3-hoops + 2-clubs events which qualified her to 2020 Summer Olympics in Tokyo, Japan.

She was selected to represent Egypt at the 2020 Summer Olympics alongside Login Elsasyed, Polina Fouda, Malak Selim, and Tia Sobhy. They finished thirteenth in the qualification round for the group all-around.

References 

Living people
2003 births
Egyptian rhythmic gymnasts
Sportspeople from Cairo
Gymnasts at the 2020 Summer Olympics
Olympic gymnasts of Egypt